The Caledonian Amateur Football League is a football (soccer) league competition for amateur clubs in Scotland.  It was formed in 1983 by inviting what were deemed to be top amateur clubs from across central Scotland with good facilities with high standards being set for admittance to the league Since its formation, the teams competing within the league have been of a good standard, with clubs from the league winning the Scottish Amateur Cup on nine occasions, also providing four losing finalists.

Member clubs are concentrated in the Central Belt of Scotland, although there is a club from the Isle of Bute, and a number of clubs from Stirlingshire.

Like several other amateur leagues, it is a stand-alone association and is not currently part of Scotland's pyramid system.

League structure

The Caledonian AFL is split into two divisions, a Premier Division of 12 clubs and a 20-strong Division One (split into Division 1A and 1B). The following model is valid as of season 2018–19:

Member clubs

The Caledonian AFL has thirty member clubs, listed below in their individual divisions :

Premier Division

Cambria AFC
Dalziel HSFP
Dumbarton Academy FP
Finnart AFC
Giffnock North AFC
Glasgow University
Glasgow Harp AFC
Milton AFC
Stenhousemuir Community AFC
Strathclyde University
Thorn Athletic AFC
Wishaw Wycombe Wanderers AFC

Division One (A)
Callander Thistle
Cambusbarron Rovers AFC
Doune Castle AFC
Eaglesham AFC
Eddlewood  AFC
FC Dal Riata AFC
Kilsyth AFC
Milngavie Wanderers AFC
Symington Tinto AFC
Weirs Recreation AFC

Division One (B)
Balmore AFC
Dunblane Soccer Club
East Kilbride YM
Holytown Colts AFC
RHU AFC
Rothesay Brandane AFC
St Mungos AFC
Stirling University
Viewfield Rovers
Westelands AFC

External links
Official website

Football leagues in Scotland
Amateur association football in Scotland
1983 establishments in Scotland
Sports leagues established in 1983